is a 24-episode anime series about the young Sarutobi Sasuke, a legendary ninja. It was first aired from October 9, 1979, to April 29, 1980, on Tokyo 12 Channel (now TV Tokyo), and was later dubbed in several languages. The whole 24-episode run was aired in many European and Arabic countries.

It is best known to the American fans as Ninja, The Wonder Boy: a highly edited, highly condensed feature-length version of this series. This version, dubbed in English, was produced by Jim Terry Productions of Force Five fame. The names of several characters were changed, with Sarutobi Sasuke becoming "Duke Hayakawa", his female companion Sakura being changed to "Blossom", and the villain Devilman became "Dragon."

See also
Shōnen Sarutobi Sasuke (Magic Boy)

External links

Anime Bargain Bin Reviews- Ninja the Wonder Boy aka Manga Sarutobi

1979 anime television series debuts
Knack Productions
Ninja in anime and manga
TV Tokyo original programming